The Civil Contingencies Committee is a British cabinet committee chaired by the Home Secretary. It is intended to deal with major crises such as terrorism or natural disasters. It is supported by the Civil Contingencies Secretariat, which is part of the Cabinet Office.

The Civil Contingencies Committee is held in Cabinet Office Briefing Room A, giving the committee its popular name COBRA. However, this is not an official name, even if it is sometimes used by officials.

The Civil Contingencies Committee, through the Civil Contingencies Secretariat, operates a website, UK Resilience, which is intended as a central source of public information on British civil defence and disaster preparedness activities.

See also
 ACCOLC
 Civil defence
 COBR
 GTPS
 Intelligence and Security Committee

References

External links 
 Emergency planning

Emergency management in the United Kingdom
Committees of the United Kingdom Cabinet Office